Still Dangerous is a live album by Irish rock band Thin Lizzy. It was compiled from two live concerts by the band at the Tower Theater in Upper Darby, Pennsylvania, U.S., just outside of Philadelphia, at 20 and 21 October 1977 during the tour in support of their Bad Reputation album. No overdubs were made to any tracks so the album is completely live. The tracks "Cowboy Song", "The Boys Are Back in Town", "Massacre" and "Emerald" were previously released on the album Live and Dangerous, while "Opium Trail" and "Bad Reputation" were issued on the Killers Live EP in 1981.

"Bad Reputation" and "Emerald" are bonus tracks made only available as downloads outside Japan.  They are also available as a bonus 7" 45 RPM single on the U.S. vinyl version of the release.

The live recordings of "Jailbreak", "Cowboy Song", and "The Boys are Back in Town" from this album are available as downloadable content as a Thin Lizzy track pack for the music video game Rock Band.

The album features the common live Thin Lizzy practice of running one song straight into some more popular hit, typically using the ending note of one as the starting note of the next, notably with "Cowboy Song" which finishes with the first note of "The Boys Are Back in Town" and "Soldier of Fortune" which leads directly into "Jailbreak".  This live version of "The Boys Are Back in Town" is used over the end credits of the film The Expendables (rather than the more well-known studio version from Jailbreak).

Track listing
"Soldier of Fortune" (Phil Lynott) - 5:22
"Jailbreak" (Lynott) - 4:28
"Cowboy Song" (Brian Downey, Lynott) - 5:04
"The Boys Are Back in Town" (Lynott) - 4:46
"Dancing in the Moonlight" (Lynott) - 4:08
"Massacre" (Downey, Scott Gorham, Lynott) - 3:02
"Opium Trail" (Downey, Gorham, Lynott) - 4:51
"Don't Believe a Word" (Lynott) - 2:25
"Baby Drives Me Crazy" (Downey, Gorham, Lynott, Brian Robertson) - 6:11
"Me and the Boys" (Lynott) - 6:48
"Bad Reputation" (Downey, Gorham, Lynott) - 4:19
"Emerald" (Gorham, Downey, Robertson, Lynott) - 4:35

Personnel
Thin Lizzy
Phil Lynott – bass guitar, lead vocals
Scott Gorham – lead guitar, backing vocals, producer
Brian Robertson – lead guitar, backing vocals
Brian Downey – drums, percussion

Additional musicians
John Earle – saxophone on "Dancing in the Moonlight"

Production
Glyn Johns - producer, mixing

Charts

References

Albums produced by Glyn Johns
2009 live albums
Thin Lizzy live albums